The planalto slaty antshrike (Thamnophilus pelzelni) is a species of bird in the family Thamnophilidae.
It is endemic to eastern and south-central Brazil. It was previously included in the widespread slaty antshrike (T. punctatus), but following the split, this scientific name is now restricted to the northern slaty antshrike.

Its occurs at low levels in forest and woodland, especially in areas with dense growth.

References

External links
Planalto slaty antshrike: Photos, vocalizations from "Avifauna of the Interior of Ceará, Brazil"

planalto slaty antshrike
Birds of Brazil
Endemic birds of Brazil
planalto slaty antshrike
Taxonomy articles created by Polbot